The 1986 Orkney Islands Council election, the fifth election to Orkney Islands Council, was held on 4 May 1986 as part of the wider 1986 Scottish regional elections. The election saw the Independents take all save one of the seats on the council, securing them an overall majority.

Results

Ward Results

References

Orkney
Orkney Islands Council elections